Fair and Tender Ladies is a novel by Lee Smith published in 1988.  It won the W.D. Weatherford Award that year.
Fair and Tender Ladies is an epistolary novel consisting entirely of letters written by its protagonist, Ivy Rowe, to numerous recipients from her childhood until her old age.  It is set mostly in the Blue Ridge Mountains and covers events from shortly before World War I until the Vietnam era. The novel garnered much critical acclaim and has been adapted for the stage, including a musical version for the Alabama Shakespeare Festival.

References

1988 American novels
American historical novels
Epistolary novels